Phallus flavidus is a species of fungus in the stinkhorn family. Described as new to science in 2009, it is found in the Seychelles.

References

External links

Fungi of Seychelles
Fungi described in 2009
Phallales